Bahçesultan is a village in the Pazaryeri District, Bilecik Province, Turkey. Its population is 73 (2021).

References

Villages in Pazaryeri District